W. Max Finley Stadium is the home stadium for the University of Tennessee at Chattanooga football team and Chattanooga FC (NISA), a professional Division 3 soccer team. The stadium also hosts various high school sports and musical concerts. It is located in Chattanooga, Tennessee, United States. The stadium, which opened in 1997, has a current capacity of 20,412, and hosted the NCAA Division I National Championship Game from its opening season through 2009, after which the game moved to Pizza Hut Park in the Dallas suburb of Frisco, Texas. The stadium will host the TSSAA Football Championships in 2021 and 2022.

The stadium is named in honor of W. Max Finley, former chairman of the Rock Tenn Corporation, who was an alumnus and active supporter of the University of Tennessee system. The playing field is named in honor of Gordon Lee Davenport, the president and CEO of the Krystal Company from 1975 to 1985 who served as Chairman of the Stadium Corporation and Campaign and worked endlessly and tirelessly in the planning and actual development of the facility. Bronze busts of both Finley and Davenport adorn the main entryway to the stadium.

History
In 1997, the University of Tennessee at Chattanooga football program stopped using Chamberlain Field and started using Finley-Davenport. On Oct. 18, 1997, the Mocs opened up their new home, Finley Stadium Davenport Field, as an overflow crowd of 22,646 watched UTC defeat Tennessee State 28-7.

The 20,412-seat facility (original capacity: 20,668) is part of the city's Southside revitalization project. A stadium project for UTC and Chattanooga had been talked about by city leaders for quite some time before it came to fruition. Chamberlain Field on the UTC campus, which opened in 1908, had the distinction of being the second-oldest on-campus stadium in the nation. Officials agreed that something needed to be done.

The $28.5 million project needed supporters to become a reality and got plenty of them. Donations from the private sector ranged anywhere from a 10 dollar bill to $1 million. In fact, nearly 40 percent, or $10.2 million of the project, came from private donations. The City of Chattanooga and Hamilton County contributed $13 million, the State of Tennessee gave $3.5 million, and the University donated $2.9 million.

Ground breaking on the site that was once the Rock Tenn plant was held March 7, 1996. Seven months later, the Stadium Corporation named the facility Finley Stadium Davenport Field.

In 2015, a new turf surface was installed to replace the old for $600,000 – with the ability to erase football lines or soccer lines depending on the event to be held.

Features
The facility, designed by Derthick, Henley & Wilkerson and built by C&I Specialty, both of Chattanooga, contains 32 luxury sky boxes and 1,566 preferred seats with chairbacks. The $350,000 scoreboard includes a giant matrix screen and the Stadium Club can hold 250 for pregame or postgame functions. The press box can hold 60 media representatives, has three radio booths, and a television broadcast booth. Prior to 2015, on either side of the pressbox was the stadium's "Wall of Champions", featuring a plaque celebrating each of the 13 NCAA Division I FCS teams to have won a championship here. Identical home and visitors locker rooms contain a separate training area and coaches locker room, as well as an extensive player locker area.

Adjacent to the stadium is the First Horizon Pavilion. The old Ross-Meehan Foundry has been renovated into an open-air pavilion which has become a favorite for tailgaters, complete with food and beverage concessions and a children's area. The pavilion offers tailgaters a perfect atmosphere around the stadium while providing protection from the weather without being indoors.

Notable Events
The U.S. Men's National soccer team played a friendly match vs. Jamaica on February 3, 2017 at Finley Stadium. The U.S. defeated Jamaica 1–0.

NCAA Division I Football Championship

See also
 McKenzie Arena
 List of NCAA Division I FCS football stadiums

References

External links
 Finley Stadium page 

College football venues
Chattanooga Mocs football
Sports venues in Chattanooga, Tennessee
American football venues in Tennessee
Soccer venues in Tennessee
1997 establishments in Tennessee
National Premier Soccer League stadiums
National Independent Soccer Association stadiums